Ian Haug (born 21 February 1970) is an Australian musician and the lead guitarist, songwriter, and backing vocalist in the rock band Powderfinger from its formation in 1989 until its breakup in 2010. He is presently a member of The Church.

Powderfinger

Powderfinger was formed in 1989 by vocalist and guitarist Ian Haug, bass guitarist John Collins and drummer Steven Bishop, who took their band's name from the Neil Young song "Powderfinger". Before the band's formation, Haug had played in other Brisbane-based outfits. The band later sought an extra guitarist, Bernard Fanning, who Haug had met in a university class. Fanning took over the role of lead vocals from Haug, and at the same time Jon Coghill joined, replacing Bishop. Powderfinger's final line-up change came with the addition of guitarist Darren Middleton. The line-up of Coghill, Collins, Fanning, Haug and Middleton remained unchanged from 1992 onwards.

Far Out Corporation
Haug and Grant McLennan formed the  Far Out Corporation in 1996 and made one record - and performed a handful of shows to critical acclaim. During a hiatus (2004–2006) in Powderfinger's career, Haug worked on a side project, The Predators, with Collins and original Powderfinger member  Steven Bishop on drums and vocals. During all live Predators shows Ross McLennan played drums while Steven Bishop stepped to the front of the stage. In April 2010, Powderfinger announced it would disband after their final tour in September–October.

The Predators
In 2004, Powderfinger decided to take some time off to allow the band members to begin families and pursue side projects. In this downtime Haug formed The Predators with the original Powderfinger lineup of drummer/vocalist Steven Bishop and bassist John Collins. The band, like the other side projects for Powderfinger, was signed to the Dew Process record label. The Predators released a six track EP in 2006 and were joined live by drummer Ross McLennan.

In 2007, Haug reunited with Powderfinger to release their sixth studio album Dream Days at the Hotel Existence. They followed with their seventh studio album, Golden Rule in 2009. In April 2010, Powderfinger announced it would disband after their final tour in September–October.

The Church
In 2013, following the departure of guitarist Marty Willson-Piper, Haug joined Australian band The Church and during the early parts of 2014 they recorded an album, Further/Deeper, which was released in October 2014 and toured Australia in the latter part of that year. Haug then toured with the band in the United States in 2015 and 2016.

Haug is now a full member of The Church. He wrote and recorded with the band on the next album Man Woman Life Death Infinity, and toured with them for that album as well as the Starfish 30th Anniversary Tour.

Awards and nominations

APRA Awards
The APRA Awards are presented annually from 1982 by the Australasian Performing Right Association (APRA).

|-
|rowspan="2"| 2004 || Powderfinger – Bernard Fanning, Jon Coghill, Haug, Darren Middleton, John Collins || Songwriter of the Year || 
|-
|"On My Mind" – Bernard Fanning, Darren Middleton, John Collins, Haug, Jon Coghill || Most Performed Australian Work|| 
|-
|rowspan="2"| 2008 ||rowspan="2"| "Lost and Running" – Jon Coghill, John Collins, Bernard Fanning, Haug, Darren Middleton || Song of the Year || 
|-
|Most Played Australian Work ||

Notes

APRA Award winners
Living people
Australian rock guitarists
Powderfinger members
1970 births
The Church (band) members